Turn It Loud is the debut studio album by Canadian hard rock band Headpins, released in 1982. By 1983, the album had been certified double platinum in Canada (in excess of 200,000 copies sold).

Track listing
All songs are written by Brian MacLeod unless otherwise noted.

"Turn It Loud" – 3:58
"Keep Walkin' Away" (Brian MacLeod, Darby Mills, Ab Bryant, Bernie Aubin) – 4:35
"Don't Ya Ever Leave" – 5:33
"People" – 6:33
"Don't It Make Ya Feel" (MacLeod, Mills) – 4:09
"Winnin'" (MacLeod, Mills) – 4:02
"You Can't Have Me" – 5:29
"Breakin' Down" – 7:01

Personnel
Headpins
 Darby Mills – lead vocals
 Brian MacLeod – guitar
 Ab Bryant – bass
 Bernie Aubin – drums

Production
 Brian MacLeod – producer
 Bill Henderson – producer
 Ab Bryant – assistant to the producer
 Bob Defrin – art direction
 Patrick Glover – engineer
 Don Brautigam – illustration
 Bob Ludwig 
 Sam Feldman – manager
 David Slagter

References

1982 albums
Hard rock albums by Canadian artists